John Enos Prescod (born 12 December 1923) was a Jamaican cricketer. He played in seven first-class matches for the Jamaican cricket team from 1947 to 1953.

See also
 List of Jamaican representative cricketers

References

External links
 

1923 births
Possibly living people
Jamaican cricketers
Jamaica cricketers
People from Manchester Parish